At the top level of administration, Belarus is divided into six oblasts (voblasts or provinces). The city of Minsk, has a special status as the capital of Belarus. Minsk is also the capital of Minsk Region.

At the second level, the regions are divided into raions (districts).

The layout and extent of the regions were set in 1960 when Belarus (then the Byelorussian Soviet Socialist Republic) formed a constituent republic of the Soviet Union.

History 
At the start of the 20th century, the boundaries of the Belarusian lands within the Russian Empire were still being defined. In 1900 it was contained within all of the Minsk and Mogilev governorates, most of Grodno Governorate, parts of Vitebsk Governorate, and parts of Vilna Governorate. World War I, the independence of Poland, as well as the 1920-1921 Polish–Soviet War affected the boundaries. In 1921, Belarus had what is now all of Minsk Governorate except for the western fringe, the western part of Gomel Region, a western slice of Mogilev, and a small part of Vitebsk Region. In 1926, the eastern part of Gomel region was added.  

In the Byelorussian SSR, new administrative units, called oblasts or voblasts (cognate of Russian word oblast with prothetic v-) were introduced in 1938. During World War II, Belarus gained territory to the west, with the Baranavichy, Belastok (Białystok), Brest, Pinsk, and Vileyka oblasts. In 1944, Belastok was eliminated and the new oblasts of Babruysk, Grodno, and Polotsk were created. At that same time, Vileika oblast was renamed Molodechno Oblast.

At different times between 1938 and 1960, the following oblasts existed:

 Babruysk Oblast, created 1944, eliminated 1954
 Baranavichy Oblast, created 1939, eliminated 1954
 Belastok Oblast, created 1939, eliminated 1944 (now Białystok in Poland)
 Brest Oblast, created 1939
 Gomel Oblast, created 1938
 Grodno Oblast, created 1944
 Maladzyechna Oblast renamed from Vileyka Oblast 1944, eliminated 1960
 Mogilev Oblast, created 1938
 Minsk Oblast, created 1938
 Navahrudak Oblast, created 1939, renamed Baranavichy Oblast December 1939
 Pinsk Oblast, created 1939, eliminated 1954
 Polatsk Oblast, created 1944, eliminated 1954
 Polesia Oblast, created 1938, eliminated 1954
 Vitebsk Oblast, created 1938
 Vileyka Oblast, created 1939, renamed to Maladzyechna Oblast 1944

Regions

Historical division

See also
ISO 3166-2:BY, the ISO codes of the oblasts of Belarus.
List of regions of Belarus by Human Development Index

References

External links
 Interactive map of Belarus
 Regions (oblasts) of Belarus, The official President's website
 Geography of Belarus, The official website of Belarus
 Belarusian regions, towns and villages
 Current Status of United Nations Romanization Systems for Geographical Names of Belarus

 
Belarus
Belarus
Regions, Belarus
Belarus geography-related lists